Zonta can refer to:

Surname
María Zonta (born 1989), Argentine volleyball player
Peter Žonta (born 1979), Slovenian ski jumper
Ricardo Zonta (born 1976), Brazilian racing driver

Other uses
Zonta (Republic of Venice), extraordinary adjunct members to the Venetian governing councils
Zonta International, service organization
Giunti (printers), Florentine family of printers, also spelled Zonta